New Stark is an unincorporated community in Hancock County, in the U.S. state of Ohio.

History
A post office called New Stark was established in 1886, and remained in operation until 1903. Besides the post office, New Stark had a sawmill and several country stores.

References

Unincorporated communities in Hancock County, Ohio
Unincorporated communities in Ohio